Halla may refer to:

Halla (horse), a show jumping horse that won a record three Olympic gold medals
Halla (name), list of people with the name
Halla Group, a South Korean chaebol
Anyang Halla, a professional hockey team in Asia League Ice Hockey
MS Halla, a ro-ro ferry in service with Seaboard during 1987
Challah, a type of bread

Places
Halla, Punjab, a town in the Punjab province of Pakistan
Halla, Estonia, a village in Vastseliina Parish, Võru County, Estonia
Hallasan (Mount Halla), a mountain in South Korea
Halla University, a Korean University

Fictional places
Halla (fictional kingdom), a fictional kingdom depicted in Goopy Gyne Bagha Byne
Halla, a name given to the multiverse featured in The Pendragon Adventure by DJ MacHale
Halla (Stargate), a planet in the fictional universe of Stargate SG-1
Halla (Dragon Age), a white deer like creature sacred to the video games 'dalish' wood elves.

See also
 Hala (disambiguation)
 Hallas, a surname
 Halle (disambiguation)